Svolhusgreini is a mountain on the border of Agder and Vestfold og Telemark counties in southern Norway. The mountain sits on the border of the municipalities of Bykle in Agder and Tokke in Vestfold og Telemark. It is located in the Setesdalsheiene mountains about half-way between the mountains of Brandsnutene to the north and Sæbyggjenuten to the south.

See also
List of mountains of Norway

References

Mountains of Agder
Mountains of Vestfold og Telemark
Bykle
Tokke